La Masia de Can Planes, usually shortened to La Masia, is a term used for FC Barcelona's youth academy. The academy includes more than 300 young players. It has been an instrumental factor in Barcelona's European success, and produced several world class players in the early 2000s.

In 2010, La Masia became the first youth academy to have trained all three finalists for the Ballon d'Or in a single year: Andrés Iniesta, Lionel Messi and Xavi.

La Masia is also the name of FC Barcelona's football training facilities, originally located near the Camp Nou in the Les Corts district of Barcelona. The original building itself was an ancient country residence (In Catalan: masia) built in 1702, and once Camp Nou was inaugurated in 1957, the building was remodelled and extended for use as the club's social headquarters. With the gradual expansion of the club, the building became too small for headquarters, and on 20 October 1979, La Masia was converted into a dormitory for young players from outside Barcelona. On 30 June 2011, the Masia building ceased housing the academy players. In a simple ceremony, the doors were closed and the Ciutat Esportiva Joan Gamper took over the function of the residential center for the players.

History

La Masia de Can Planes was an old Catalan farmhouse, built in 1702. In 1979, it was first used by the club to house its young footballers who originated from outside Barcelona. The idea for the youth academy was proposed to Núñez by Jaume Amat, and Oriol Tort was put in charge of the facility.

In 2011, it was announced that Barcelona would be moving all its football training activities to La Ciutat Esportiva Joan Gamper.

La Masia received more publicity after Barcelona B's success with homegrown players; Rory Smith reported in The Daily Telegraph that La Masia "has replaced the fabled Ajax Academy as football's foremost production line". The recent fame and success of La Masia as a talent school was ascribed by Ian Hawkey of The Times to the class of 1987, which featured prominent members such as Cesc Fàbregas, Lionel Messi, Gerard Piqué and Pedro. In 2000, Louis van Gaal, coach of Barcelona's first team, was widely ridiculed by the city sports media for his dream to win the Champions League with 11 home-grown players. The first team won the trophy in 2009 with eight home-grown players.

From 1979 to 2009, 440 youngsters have left their homes and families to stay at the academy. About half of them were from Catalonia, and the rest came from other regions of the Kingdom of Spain and beyond, including 15 from Cameroon, 7 from Brazil, 5 from Senegal and 3 from Argentina. Of those 440, 40 made it into Barcelona's first team.

Organization
La Masia houses about 60 players: 10 in the farmhouse, and the rest in rooms of the adjacent stadium; the rest of the youth players must provide for their own accommodation.
The academy is one of the most expensive in Europe, operating at a cost of £5 million a year. The main cost is the dormitory, La Masia itself. The minimum age for the youth program is six years; each year, more than 1,000 boys from the ages of six to eight try out for admission. The best 200 are selected. The club also actively seeks for prospective students; it employs a system in which 15 scouts are deployed in Catalonia, 15 in the rest of Spain and 10 scattered throughout the world. To alleviate the expenses of this scouting, the club has an agreement with 15 local clubs for them to train players who are not ready for entry into the youth academy. In return, FC Barcelona gives money, coaching and technical advice to these clubs for their services. While expanding its operations abroad, the club established five schools in Mexico and one in Egypt; successful applicants to these schools become full-time students, receiving academic education and football training.

When Guardiola re-organised the reserve side, he set up a three-staged program to formalise the advancement from Juvenil to Barcelona B and finally to the first team. The first stage of a youth player's career involves a rotation scheme with Barcelona B. The second stage involves making the player aware of his importance to the team and the expectation that the player will improve cohesion and performance within the reserve side. In the last stage, he is designated a "key" player of the B team and might be called to the first team. One of the players in the third phase is made captain, regardless of the experience of older players.

The teams at Barcelona play from August to May; mild weather at La Masia allows players to train outdoors throughout the year. The youth teams train after school; Barcelona B plays as a professional team, training in the morning and evening. All of the trainers at FC Barcelona are former professional footballers.

Barcelona B, the club's main youth team, and the 12 other youth teams contained 24 coaches and more than 300 players. There are 56 other employees, including doctors, psychologists, nutritionists, cooks and physiologists. In the 2009–10 season, the B team qualified for the Segunda División again. Barcelona B play in a 4–3–3 formation, which is the same formation employed by the first team.

Philosophy

Former technical director Pep Segura attributes the club's success to its "philosophy of play": "It is about creating one philosophy, one mentality, from the bottom of the club to the top". The philosophy consists of the application of total football mixed with traditional Spanish one-touch play (tiqui-taka). The total football approach was derived from the Netherlands football team through Cruyff. The total football approach requires the players to move in a fluid formation, where players can interchange positions quickly. In the youth academy, there is a large focus on technical ability, which is seen as a pre-requisite for inter-changes. An often-quoted reason for Barcelona's success is the continuity and commitment with which Barcelona follow the current philosophy of pass and move. Guardiola was the prototype of the pivotal midfielder; famous midfielders Xavi and Iniesta are its custodians.

Another aspect of La Masia is its marked Catalan national character—local talent in the service of a club with a strong, defining sense of the cultural make-up of Catalonia.

Impact

In 2009, Messi became the first player from La Masia to be awarded with the Ballon d'Or prize for the best footballer in Europe, and the FIFA World Player award, for the best footballer in the world.

Spain won the 2010 FIFA World Cup with seven players from Barcelona in a World Cup final. Joachim Löw, coach of Germany, said after his side's defeat by Spain that the opposition had a distinct Barcelona style: "You can see it in every pass, how Spain plays is how Barcelona plays. They can hardly be beaten. They are extremely confident and very calm in the way they circulate the ball."

On 25 November 2012, for the first time, Barcelona fielded all eleven players that have come up through La Masia in a La Liga match. After Dani Alves was substituted by Martín Montoya due to an injury in the 13th minute, Barça played the next 60 minutes with Víctor Valdés, Jordi Alba, Carles Puyol, Gerard Piqué, Montoya, Sergio Busquets, Xavi, Iniesta, Cesc Fàbregas, Pedro, and Messi.

In the years immediately following this achievement, with those players aging and Barcelona seeking to maintain their position as one of the world's top clubs, they moved towards a more conventional recruitment strategy, signing some of the most talented players from around the globe for large transfer fees, such as Neymar, Luis Suárez and Philippe Coutinho, plus younger players (most with origins in Brazil and France) expected to improve further with the club; however, this approach (combined with something of a 'stockpiling' of players due to a transfer ban for breaching regulations regarding the signing of non-EU youth players) meant there was less opportunity for local academy graduates to appear with the first team, and a perception that the quality of players produced by Barcelona was not quite as high as the previous generation. Nevertheless, the team continued to win trophies and some further canteranos did make a breakthrough into the squad, including Rafinha, Carles Aleñá and Sergi Roberto, the latter having to retrain as a right back due to the abundance of talent in his original midfield position.

La Masia have opened a Residence Academy in Arizona that leverage the same methods that La Masia does in Spain. Annually top players from the AZ academy are invited to Spain to visit La Masia.

Notable alumni

Many players from Barcelona's youth system go on to have careers in football, whether at Barcelona or at other clubs. The following is a list of players who have played at least 100 league matches with the first team.

Bold denotes players still with the club.

References
Bibliographies

 Martí Perarnau, Senda de campeones : De La Masía al Camp Nou, 10 Books (Grup 62), 2011.

Notes

External links

 Barcelona's talent factory (video)
 The academy spotlight: Ajax and Barcelona – These Football Times (2015)

Buildings and structures in Barcelona
FC Barcelona
Football academies in Spain
Les Corts (district)
1702 establishments in Spain

he:ברצלונה ב'#לה מאסיה